Rudolf Trost (born 27 August 1940) is an Austrian épée and foil fencer and modern pentathlete. He competed at the 1964, 1968 and 1972 Summer Olympics.

References

External links
 

1940 births
Living people
Austrian male foil fencers
Austrian male épée fencers
Austrian male modern pentathletes
Olympic fencers of Austria
Olympic modern pentathletes of Austria
Fencers at the 1964 Summer Olympics
Fencers at the 1968 Summer Olympics
Fencers at the 1972 Summer Olympics
Modern pentathletes at the 1964 Summer Olympics
Sportspeople from Graz
20th-century Austrian people